Letters From Home is the ninth studio album by American country music artist John Michael Montgomery, released on April 20, 2004. It features the singles "Letters from Home", "Goes Good with Beer", and "Cool" from The Very Best of John Michael Montgomery. Although "Cool", the first single, failed to chart, the title track reached #2 on the Hot Country Songs charts in mid-2004, becoming Montgomery's first Top 10 country hit since "The Little Girl" in 2000. "Goes Good with Beer" peaked at #51 on the same chart, and after its release, he exited Warner Bros.' roster.

Track listing

Personnel
As listed in liner notes.
Tom Bukovac - electric guitar
Mark Casstevens - banjo
Stuart Duncan - fiddle
Larry Franklin - fiddle
Paul Franklin - steel guitar
Byron Gallimore - acoustic guitar, electric guitar, baritone electric guitar, synth horns, synth strings
Kirk "Jelly Roll" Johnson - harmonica
B. James Lowry - acoustic guitar
Brent Mason - electric guitar
John Michael Montgomery - lead vocals
Steve Nathan - keyboards
Russ Pahl - steel guitar
Michael Rhodes - bass guitar
Russell Terrell - background vocals
Biff Watson - acoustic guitar
Lonnie Wilson - drums
Glenn Worf - bass guitar

Charts

Weekly charts

Year-end charts

References

2004 albums
John Michael Montgomery albums
Warner Records albums
Albums produced by Byron Gallimore